Humidicutis is a small genus of brightly coloured agarics, the majority of which are found in Eastern Australia. They were previously described as members of Hygrocybe. The genus Porpolomopsis is closely related, and the species in it were once placed in Humidicutis. The genus was described by mycologist Rolf Singer in 1959.

The generic name derives from the Latin humidus "moist" and cutis "skin", referring to their moist caps.

Species

See also
List of Agaricales genera

References

Agaricales genera
Hygrophoraceae
Taxa named by Rolf Singer